
Year 780 (DCCLXXX) was a leap year starting on Saturday  of the Julian calendar. The denomination 780 for this year has been used since the early medieval period, when the Anno Domini calendar era became the prevalent method in Europe for naming years.

Events 
 By place 

 Byzantine Empire 
 September 8 - Emperor Leo IV ("the Khazar") dies after a 5-year reign, in which he has been dominated by his wife Irene of Athens, an iconodule. He is succeeded by his 9-year-old son Constantine VI; due to his minority, Irene and her chief minister Staurakios exercise a regency over him.

 Europe 
 Saxon Wars: King Charlemagne decrees the death penalty for any subdued Saxon refusing Christian baptism. Meanwhile Widukind builds up rebel strength in northern Saxony. 
 The city of Osnabrück, developed as a marketplace, is founded by Charlemagne (approximate date).

 Britain 
 The city of Aldwych rises as an important trading centre in London, under Mercian control. King Offa of Mercia possibly establishes a royal palace at Aldermanbury, on the site of the old Roman Cripplegate fort and amphitheatre (approximate date).

 Asia 
 King Hyegong of Silla is killed in a revolt, terminating the kingly line of succession of former ruler Muyeol. He is the architect of Silla's unification of the Korean Peninsula (see 668).

 By topic 

 Religion 
 Borobudur, a Buddhist temple complex in Magelang (modern Indonesia), is begun (approximate date).

Births 
 Ahmad ibn Hanbal, Muslim scholar and theologian (d. 855)
 Frederick of Utrecht, Frisian bishop (approximate date)
 Guifeng Zongmi, Chinese Buddhist monk (d. 841)
 Hugh of Tours, Frankish nobleman (approximate date)
 Muḥammad ibn Mūsā al-Ḵwārizmī, Persian mathematician (approximate date)
 Rabanus Maurus, archbishop of Mainz (approximate date)
 Yunyan Tansheng, Chinese Buddhist monk (d. 841)

Deaths 
 c. June 24 – Kume no Wakame, Japanese noblewoman
 August 19 – Credan, English abbot and saint
 September 8 – Leo IV, Byzantine emperor (b. 750)
 Dunchadh ua Daimhine, king of Uí Maine (Ireland)
 Hyegong, king of Silla (Korea) (b. 758)
 Khun Lo, founder of Luang Prabang (Laos)
 Approximate date – Himiltrude, queen consort of Charlemagne (b. c.742)

References

Sources